The Valley  or The Valleys may refer to:

Places known as "The Valley"
 The Valley (London), home ground of Charlton Athletic Football Club
 The Valley, Anguilla, the capital of Anguilla
 The Valleys or the South Wales Valleys, United Kingdom
 Moonee Valley Racecourse, a horse racing track in Melbourne, Australia marketed as "The Valley"
 Tóin an tSeanbhaile, a village on Achill Island, Co. Mayo, Ireland, known colloquially in English as The Valley
 San Fernando Valley in California, often referred to as simply "The Valley"
 Phoenix metropolitan area in Arizona, called the Salt River Valley, the Valley of the Sun, or simply the Valley by locals.
 Lower Rio Grande Valley in southern Texas, often referred to as simply "The Valley"

Film and television
 The Valley (film) (The Valley), a 1972 French film
 The Valley (1976 film), a 1976 amateur film by Peter Jackson
 The Valley (2014 film), a 2014 Lebanese film
 The Valley (2017 film), an American drama film
 The Valley, a fictional television series on The O.C.
 The Valleys (TV series), British reality series

Literature
 The Valley (novel), a 2005 novel by Barry Pilton

Music
 The Valley (band), a band from Sydney
 The Valley (Ashton Nyte album) (2009)
 The Valley (Betty Who album) (2017)
 The Valley (Whitechapel album) (2019)
 The Valley, a 2011 Eisley album
 "The Valley" (Keshia Chante song), a song by Keshia Chante
 "The Valley", a song from Duran Duran's album Red Carpet Massacre
 "The Valley", a song from Jane Siberry's album Bound by the Beauty
 "The Valley", a 2016 single by Clare Maguire
 "The Valley", a song by Los Lobos on The Town and the City (album) (2006)
 "The Valley", a song from The Interrupters' album Say it out Loud (2016)
 "The Valleys", a song from The Mountains' album The Mountains, the Valleys, the Lakes (2014)

Schools 

 The Valley School, Bangalore, India
 The Valley Secondary School, former name of Albena Lake-Hodge Comprehensive School, Anguilla

See also
Valley (disambiguation)